M202 or M-202 may refer to:
 Martin 2-0-2, one of the first modern airliners
 M202 FLASH, an American rocket launcher